Ali Ashraf (17 November 1947 – 30 July 2021) was an Awami League politician who served as deputy speaker of Parliament. He became the Member of Parliament for Comilla-7 in 2008, being re-elected in 2014 and 2018.

Death 
Ashraf died on 30 July 2021 in Square Hospital, Dhaka, Bangladesh. He was suffering from gallbladder stones related problems.

References

1947 births
2021 deaths
People from Comilla District
Awami League politicians
Deputy Speakers of the Jatiya Sangsad
1st Jatiya Sangsad members
9th Jatiya Sangsad members
10th Jatiya Sangsad members
11th Jatiya Sangsad members